The men's 100 metre freestyle competition of the 2018 FINA World Swimming Championships (25 m) was held on 15 and 16 December 2018.

Records
Prior to the competition, the existing world and championship records were as follows.

Results

Heats
The heats were started on 15 December at 10:36.

Semifinals
The semifinals were started on 15 December at 19:15.

Semifinal 1

Semifinal 2

Final
The final was held on 16 December at 18:35.

References

Men's 100 metre freestyle